Michael Jordan Bonema (born October 13, 1998), known professionally as Mike (stylized as MIKE), is an American rapper, songwriter and record producer based in New York City. Bonema's non-typical upbringing, having experienced life in Livingston, London, Essex, Philadelphia and New York City, has had an audible influence on his diverse and experimental music style.

Bonema launched his professional career via his Bandcamp page in 2015. He gained interest from listeners, journalists and industry executives alike as he released several short-run EPs, his first critically reviewed mixtape, Winter New York, and his first full-length project, Longest Day, Shortest Night. Bonema then experienced a break-out year in 2017, as he became recognised within hip hop circles via his next full-length project, entitled May God Bless Your Hustle, in June 2017.

Bonema then released several follow-up projects, including Black Soap in May 2018, quickly followed by Renaissance Man in June 2018 and War in My Pen in January 2019. He has continued to gain external interest from the likes of Pitchfork, The Fader and The New Yorker for his lyricism, music production and cultural influence.

Bonema is a co-founder of Slums (stylised as [sLUms].), an online-focused, underground hip-hop collective consisting of himself, Adé Hakim, Jodi.10k (formerly Jazz Jodi), Darryl Johnson, King Carter and Mason Dreiling. He currently releases his music through his own independent record label and publishing company, 10k.



Early life
Michael Jordan Bonema was born on October 13, 1998, in Livingston, New Jersey. He spent his early years in New Jersey, before moving to England at age 5, where his mother thought he would receive better educational opportunities. Bonema spent five years growing up in the Hackney neighbourhood of London, where he claimed he was "stripped away from American culture and pushed into British culture". At age 10, Bonema first became interested in making music after listening to the English Grime artist Skepta. At age 12, Bonema returned to Philadelphia with his father, where he continued to experience and learn about American hip-hop culture. At age 16, he re-settled to The Bronx with his father, before moving to Brooklyn, eventually founding Slums with his friends.

Musical career

2008–2014: Early interest in hip hop 
Whilst living in England in 2008, a young Bonema first gained interest in hip-hop by watching the music videos of Skepta, Chipmunk and N-Dubz with his mother and older sisters. He also states that he was surrounded by Contemporary R&B artists like Chingy and Bow Wow in his early life, as he "lived in a house with lots of girls".

In 2010, upon Bonema's return to Philadelphia, he began to gain a more comprehensive interest in the culture behind hip-hop. He began to familiarise himself with the emerging American hip-hop scene, stating he studied the works of artists like Chance the Rapper, Drake and Lil Wayne. Bonema recorded his first-ever song, a cover of MF Doom and Madlib's underground hit 'All Caps', in 2012. Bonema reflects on the song as being inspired by his lifestyle in Philadelphia, having an aggressive vocal energy and acting as a simple exercise in discovering how to express himself as a 14-year-old. As Bonema grew older, he began to develop his own tastes in hip-hop and started following artists like Tyler, the Creator, Earl Sweatshirt and other members of the Odd Future collective. By 2013, Bonema started to take hip-hop more seriously, and began releasing music, emailing journalists within the industry and directly communicating with record executives.

2015: Founding Slums 

Bonema released his first-ever project, a six-track EP entitled Belgium Butter, to his Bandcamp in January 2015. Bonema states that he made this project mostly for himself, as he was trying to figure out his place in the community and rebuild self-confidence.

Around this time, Bonema was searching for independence and stability, so he co-founded an underground hip-hop group called Slums. He states the group, which consists of like-minded New York City artists Adé Hakim, aJodi.10k, Darryl Johnson, King Carter and Mason Dreiling, was an important moment in his life where he "felt good to be around people that he felt like he understood.

Bonema released two more short-run EPs throughout 2015 – Crimson EP and RAFA (running away from the ajogun), the latter of which demonstrated his renewed focus on collaborating with other members of Slums.

Bonema also worked on his breakout mixtape, Winter New York, in a shared New York City apartment with Slums throughout the year. He described the mixtape, which was centred around youth culture in New York City, as "figuring out what self-worth and confidence meant... to be able to tell my story and the stories of people I know to help somebody else".

2016: Meeting Earl Sweatshirt and joining Lex Records 
Bonema followed up his breakout mixtape in February, releasing a four-track EP entitled Jungle Boy, based on the concept of New York City representing a "jungle". Bonema then signed to the London-based independent record label Lex Records as a means of releasing, publishing and distributing his music.

He then began working on his next full-length mixtape, entitled Longest Day, Shortest Night, which was released in June. He then released two more short-run EPs to end the year, including The Ones Who Were Made By Time in September and Tonight, With You in December.

Around this time, Bonema established a connection to Earl Sweatshirt, who he describes as his "favorite rapper", after he purchased one of his projects on Bandcamp. Bonema states that they formed a mentor and mentee relationship, as Sweatshirt provided him advice on making music, learning to express himself and how to support himself as a "young black boy in America".

Bonema also learned to produce music in 2016, as his friend and fellow Slums member, Sixpress, taught him how to use the Ableton software. He says it was important as it allowed him to take full creative control of his music and be able to "100 percent" reflect and express what he was feeling.

2017: Making May God Bless Your Hustle
Bonema started working on a new mixtape, initially called By The Water, towards the beginning of 2017. He delayed the project due to artistic challenges, stating he wanted the project to reflect who he was, but was struggling as his "mind wasn't in the right place" and he felt like he wasn't being true to himself. Bonema's mother inadvertently motivated him to restart work on the project, as she posted "May God Bless Your Hustle" on his Instagram. He states that his mother's phrase perfectly summarized his situation, as he knew he was struggling with his independent life in New York City, but also knew his extended support network was continuously sending him "blessings", "gifts" and "positive energy".

Bonema continued to work on the project throughout the year, recording half of the songs at his home in Bedford–Stuyvesant whilst recording the other half at XL Recordings in Lower Manhattan. In June, he released the completed project as a pay what you want download on his Bandcamp, thanking several people within his support network, including his mother, father, sisters, Sweatshirt and members of Slums, for their contributions.

Bonema continued the year by starting work on his commercial debut, a self-produced, short-player entitled By The Water EP.

2018–2021: Black Soap, Renaissance Man, War in My Pen, Tears of Joy, Weight of the World, and Disco! 
Bonema began to work on his next project, Black Soap, whilst living independently in London at the start of 2018. He started to roll out the project in April, as he released the lead single "Time Ain't Enough", shared a music video produced by 10k Productions and provided a full list of the project's collaborators, including Standing on the Corner, Darryl Johnson, Adé Sayed, and his mother, Anu Akinbobye. He made the project available in May, which he described as "made with passion, love, and community", via online streaming, digital downloads and physical copies through Bandcamp.

Bonema then focused on his follow-up project, Renaissance Man, which was released on the one-year anniversary of his breakout mixtape, May God Bless Your Hustle, in June. Shortly after, Bonema announced a further project, titled War in My Pen, to be released in December. He stated it would be a 13-track effort produced by DJ Blackpower, featuring New York City-based artists and Slums affiliates Medhane, Sage Elesser and King Carter, as well as London-based artists Jadasea and Redlee. The project was released independently through Bonema's own record label 10k.

Bonema, alongside BbyMutha, Na-Kel Smith, Liv.e and Black Noi$e, was announced as a support act for Earl Sweatshirt's Fire It Up! tour in January. Sweatshirt launched the tour in March, performing across several locations within the United States and England throughout the three-month tour.

On June 21, 2019, Bonema released Tears of Joy and Weight of the World on June 21, 2020. On October 31, 2020, Bonema released his debut EP blp2020: "king of the night" under the alias dj blackpower. A second EP under the same alias, titled BLP2021: "For Ur Own Good", was released in early 2021.

Bonema released Disco! on June 21, 2021, peaking at number 98 on the Billboard Top Current Album Sales chart.

2022–present: Beware of the Monkey 
On October 13, 2022, Bonema announced Beware of the Monkey, released on December 21, 2022. The first album single, "nuthin i can do is wrng", was released on October 13, 2022. The second single, "What Do I Do?", was released on November 3, 2022. The third and last single, "Stop Worry" featuring Sister Nancy, was released on November 29, 2022.

Artistry 
Bonema has been described as hip hop's newest "wunderkind" and was branded as one of the most important figures in contemporary hip-hop by the likes of Pitchfork, The Fader and The New Yorker. He is characterised primarily by his voice, which has been classified as "monotone and muffled", as well as his "intoxicatingly slow" vocal delivery, his "preternatural sense" of understanding rhythmic technique and his "signature blend" of lo-fi drum beats and contorted jazz loops. He also been praised as a "natural-born storyteller" that can effectively share observations, thoughts and confessions about trying to exist as an adolescent.

Influences 

Bonema states his earliest influence was Skepta, whilst also citing MF Doom, Chance the Rapper, Drake, Lil Wayne and Tyler, the Creator as major contributors to his sound. He also cites Sade, King Krule and mentor Earl Sweatshirt as important influencers regarding his writing style, as he appreciates how they make "real life music" where the "simple stuff hits you the hardest". Bonema's support of MF Doom helped influence his stage name, MIKE, as the alias developed through his first recorded song where he rapped, 'Something, something, something, write my name in all caps like DOOM did'.

Bonema regards Between the World and Me by Ta-Nehisi Coates and Punkzilla by Adam Rapp as important books that improved his creative processes. He states they were important as they taught him how to use music as a medium to express himself.

Bonema also cites the women in his life, including his mother, older sisters and school teachers, as major inspirations. He states that the title of his break-out mixtape, May God Bless Your Hustle, was inspired by a phrase his mother used to say to him.

Personal life 
Bonema recalls that his childhood was difficult, having to "adjust over and over again" each time he moved between Livingston, London, Essex, Philadelphia and New York City. He also states that he started to distance himself and avoid communicating with others because it was "too much work". He often reflects on his mental health issues, stating he first dealt with depression as a 14-year-old, as it "was a weird time" where he was forced to be independent and didn't know much about self-worth. He also states he experienced anxiety at school as he was "around too many people" and was "being told to do things".

Bonema remains close with his family, as he consistently visits his New York-based sisters, contacts his Philadelphia-based father and was reunited with his London-based mother despite her living in Nigeria after "paperwork issues". He also positively reflects on his relationship with Earl Sweatshirt, stating he "understands how we express ourselves" and has spent time teaching him about life.

Bonema says music is the most important part of his life, as the stage is the only place he feels comfortable. He further states that he struggles to communicate his feelings face-to-face, but is able to "translate it through different forms". Bonema prefers to release music via Bandcamp, but has started to release select projects to SoundCloud, Spotify and Apple Music.

Discography

Albums

Extended plays

Singles

As lead artist

As featured artist

Guest appearances

References 

1998 births
American male rappers
Rappers from the Bronx
Songwriters from New York (state)
Record producers from New York (state)
Alternative hip hop musicians
People from Livingston, New Jersey
Living people
American male songwriters